Nandan Saxena is a multi National Film Award winning Indian documentary filmmaker. He has won National film Awards thrice.

Awards

Selected filmography
I Cannot Give You My Forest (2014)
Cotton for My Shroud (2011)
Candles In The Wind (2013)
Wings 
A stitch in time

Personal life
Saxena's parents were teachers. He studied journalism. He is married to Kavita Bahl, an Indian filmmaker. The couple quit journalism on returning to Delhi in 1996 and took on film-making.

References

Indian documentary filmmakers
Year of birth missing (living people)
Living people